João Timóteo da Costa (1879 – 20 March 1932) was an Afro-Brazilian painter and decorative artist.

Biography
He was born in Rio de Janeiro. His brother, Arthur Timótheo da Costa, was also a painter. They initially worked together as apprentices at the Brazilian Mint in Rio de Janeiro, where they designed stamps and created prints. He entered the Escola Nacional de Belas Artes in 1894, where his instructors included Rodolfo Amoedo, João Zeferino da Costa and Daniel Bérard (1846–1910).

Among his other notable decorative works were the headquarters of the Fluminense Football Club, the Noble Hall of the Tiradentes Palace and murals at Copacabana Palace, all in Rio de Janeiro.

His brother went insane, dying prematurely in 1920, and his daughter died at the age of six. He never fully recovered from these tragedies and also became mentally ill.

Selected paintings

References

External links 

1879 births
1932 deaths
Brazilian painters
Afro-Brazilian people
Brazilian muralists
Artists from Rio de Janeiro (city)